Lindsay Reynolds is an American event planner and government employee who served as the chief of staff of First Lady of the United States Melania Trump. Prior to her appointment on February 1, 2017, she was associate director of the White House Visitors Office under President George W. Bush.

Early life 
Reynolds is a native of Cincinnati, Ohio.

Career 
Reynold worked as a third grade teacher in Cincinnati, Ohio before joining the Bush Administration in 2004. After leaving the Bush Administration, Reynolds established her own event planning business.

On April 7, 2020, First Lady Melania Trump announced that Reynolds had resigned as Chief of Staff "to spend time with her family", and that Stephanie Grisham would immediately replace her in the role.

Personal life 
Reynolds is the daughter-in-law of Republican fundraiser Mercer Reynolds.

References 

Living people
Year of birth missing (living people)
Trump administration personnel
People from Cincinnati
Schoolteachers from Ohio
21st-century American educators
21st-century American women educators